There are two species of skink named orange-tailed shadeskink, both native to Australia:

 Saproscincus challengeri
 Saproscincus rosei